(released in North America as Yoshi Topsy-Turvy) is a 2004 platform game for the Game Boy Advance that was developed by Artoon and published by Nintendo. It features a built-in tilt sensor, which is used to manipulate the game's environment. By tilting the Game Boy Advance left or right, the player can tilt the game area, causing enemies and other objects to slide as the direction of gravity changes. This gameplay mechanic is used to solve puzzles or aid Yoshi in completing levels. The game received mixed reviews.

Gameplay
Each course is controlled by a spirit, each with an obsession — one loves money, one loves fast things, one loves friendliness, one loves strength, etc. They will set out guidelines for the course, such as collecting fruit to free a certain number of Egglings, finishing a course before time runs out, finding a certain number of coins or defeating — or not defeating — a certain number of enemies. By satisfying that spirit's requirements, players pass the course.

Yoshi can jump and stick out his tongue to eat fruit or enemies. After eating an enemy, Yoshi will produce a small puff of air instead of making eggs. The main feature of the game is the tilt mechanism. By moving the Game Boy Advance side to side, players tilt the world around Yoshi, causing enemies to roll around, swinging ships and pendulums, and bouncing items all over the place. An impassable wall will become a climbable slope, or a rolled-up carpet will become a long platform. Each environment requires players to master not only button presses but also tilt movements to progress.

Plot

When Bowser starts wreaking havoc on Yoshi's Island, a book spirit named Hongo traps the island within the pages of a storybook. Only by locking Bowser away, Yoshi can convince Hongo to release the rest of the island, so he sets out to progress through the chapters of the book.

Reception

At the time of its release, most critics thought of Yoshi's Universal Gravitation as a mediocre title. Craig Harris of IGN said the game was too short, and most critics thought the other Game Boy Advance game to use a tilt sensor, WarioWare: Twisted!, was a better example of tilt-sensing technology in video games. 1UP.com's Jeremy Parish called the tilt controls "graceless and clumsy" and the character animations "choppy", concluding that it was a "mediocre" and "boring" game. GameSpot's Justin Calvert thought the tilting worked alright and enjoyed the graphics and difficulty curve, but overall found the game to be "repetitive and disappointingly short". Game Informer enjoyed the tilt sensing, calling it a "neat" and "inventive" mechanic that "breathe[d] new life into the [platformer] genre", but was disappointed by the level designs, which were mostly "pretty standard fare."

See also
Koro Koro Puzzle Happy Panechu!
Kirby Tilt 'n' Tumble
WarioWare: Twisted!

Notes

References

External links
 Official website (Japanese)

Yoshi video games
Game Boy Advance games
Game Boy Advance-only games
2004 video games
Video games developed in Japan
Video games set on fictional islands
Single-player video games
Artoon games
Video games scored by Tatsuyuki Maeda
Video games scored by Masaru Setsumaru
Video games scored by Mariko Nanba